Karin Aune (born 29 April 1975) is a road cyclist from Sweden. She represented her nation at the 2006 and 2008 UCI Road World Championships.

References

External links
 profile at Procyclingstats.com

1975 births
Swedish female cyclists
Living people
Place of birth missing (living people)